Patryk Grzegorzewicz (born 26 May 2002 in Raciborz) is a Polish sprinter.

He was selected to participate in the 2020 Tokyo Summer Olympics.

Stats

References 

2002 births
Living people
21st-century Polish people